Sharafshah (also Romanized as Sharafshāh) is a village in Sumar Rural District, Sumar District, Qasr-e Shirin County, Kermanshah Province, Iran. At the 2006 census, its population was 9, in 6 families.

References 

Populated places in Qasr-e Shirin County